Kadaloor LRT station is an elevated Light Rail Transit (LRT) station on the Punggol LRT line East Loop in Punggol, Singapore, located at Punggol Drive between the junctions of Punggol East and Edgedale Plains. It was opened on 29 January 2005 together with the Sengkang LRT West Loop. Kadaloor was named after Cuddalore, an ancient town in the Indian state of Tamil Nadu.

Etymology
The name "கடலூர்"(Sea town) was recommended for reason of the cultural diversity in the selection of names, as well as the station's proximity to Sungei Serangoon (Serangoon River).

References

External links

Railway stations in Singapore opened in 2005
Punggol
LRT stations in Punggol
Railway stations in Punggol
Light Rail Transit (Singapore) stations